The internal iliac lymph nodes (or hypogastric) surround the internal iliac artery and its branches (the hypogastric vessels), and receive the lymphatics corresponding to the distribution of the branches of it, i. e., they receive lymphatics from all the pelvic viscera, from the deeper parts of the perineum, including the membranous and cavernous portions of the urethra, and from the buttock and back of the thigh. The internal iliac lymph nodes also drain the superior half of the rectum, above the pectinate line.

It does not receive lymph from the ovary or testis, which drain to the paraaortic lymph nodes.

Additional images

See also
 External iliac lymph nodes
 pararectal lymph nodes

References

Lymphatics of the torso